Richard Spencer may refer to:

Politicians
Richard Spencer (died 1414), MP for Salisbury
Richard Spencer (Royalist) (1593–1661), English politician and Royalist
Richard Spencer (Maryland politician) (1796–1868), American politician and member of the United States House of Representatives
Richard Austin Spencer, MP for St. Helens
Richard V. Spencer (born 1954), United States Secretary of the Navy 2017–2019

Other
Richard B. Spencer (born 1978), American neo-Nazi and white supremacist
Richard Spencer (Royal Navy officer) (1779–1839)
Richard Lewis Spencer, American musician
Richard Spencer (journalist) (born 1965), British journalist
F. Richard Spencer (born 1951), Bishop of the Roman Catholic Archdiocese for the Military Services, U.S.
Richard Spencer (athlete) (born 1955), Cuban former high jumper
Richard Ball Spencer (1812–1897), British marine painter
Rick Spencer (singer) (born 1952), American folk singer-songwriter and musical historian
Rick Spencer (Hollyoaks), a character in Hollyoaks

See also
Richard Spencer haircut